DiBiase may refer to:

 Brett DiBiase (born 1988), American retired professional wrestler and referee
 Mike DiBiase (wrestler, born 1923) (1923–1969), known as Iron Mike DiBiase, American professional wrestler
 Mike DiBiase (wrestler, born 1977) (born 1977), American professional wrestler
 Ted DiBiase (born 1954), American professional wrestler, manager, ordained minister and color commentator
 Ted DiBiase Jr. (born 1982), American professional wrestler and actor

See also 
 Dibiase (music producer), American music producer
 Di Biase, a surname
 Dibiasi, a surname